Tore Vikingstad (born 8 October 1975) is a retired Norwegian professional ice hockey player.

Career

Club career
He played for Viking and Stjernen in Norway, then Färjestad and Leksand in Sweden until 2001. He was selected by the St. Louis Blues in the sixth round, 180th overall, in the 1999 NHL Entry Draft.

A stint in the DEG Metro Stars from 2001 to 2008 was followed by three seasons in the Hannover Scorpions. In the 2005-2006 season of the Deutsche Eishockey Liga, he was named MVP and also became the top scorer in the same season with a total of 71 points. That accomplishment also led to Vikingstad being named the best Norwegian ice hockey player of 2005-06, earning him the Golden Puck award.

He returned to Norway Stavanger Oilers, and retired in 2013 after winning the domestic cup.

International career
In the 2010 Winter Olympics at Vancouver, Vikingstad scored a hat trick against Switzerland on February 20 during pool play.

Post-playing career
In June 2013 he was elected to the board of the Norwegian Ice Hockey Association.

Career statistics

Regular season and playoffs

International

References

1975 births
Living people
Sportspeople from Trondheim
Norwegian ice hockey centres
Färjestad BK players
Leksands IF players
DEG Metro Stars players
Hannover Scorpions players
Stjernen Hockey players
Viking Hockey players
Olympic ice hockey players of Norway
Ice hockey players at the 2010 Winter Olympics
Norwegian expatriate ice hockey people
St. Louis Blues draft picks
NIHF Golden Puck winners
Norwegian sports executives and administrators